High Hat is a 1927 American film directed by James Ashmore Creelman.

Plot
High Hat is a movie extra at First National Pictures, but sees himself as the studio pundit, dispensing advice to stars such as John Barrymore and Pola Negri. A studio seamstress named Millie gets him a lucrative "closeup" assignment in the German director Von Strogoff's epic about the Russian Revolution, but he gets fired after falling asleep on a prop bed. Millie loses valuable jewellery entrusted by her to the thief Tony, and High Hat comes to her rescue. His fight with Tony is recorded by Von Strogoff and used in the film.

References

External links

1927 films
1920s English-language films
1927 directorial debut films
1927 comedy films
First National Pictures films
American black-and-white films
American silent feature films
Silent American comedy films
1920s American films